Ram Sagar Rawat (born 13 July 1951) is an Indian politician from Barabanki, Uttar Pradesh.

He was elected to 6th, 9th, 10th,11th and 13th Lok Sabha from Barabanki (Lok Sabha constituency)

References

1951 births
Living people
People from Barabanki district
India MPs 1977–1979
Lok Sabha members from Uttar Pradesh
India MPs 1989–1991
India MPs 1991–1996
India MPs 1996–1997
India MPs 1999–2004
Samajwadi Party politicians from Uttar Pradesh